Yawarqucha (Quechua yawar blood, qucha lake, "blood lake", hispanicized spelling Yahuarcocha) is a mountain at a small lake of that name in the Andes of Peru, about  high. It is located in the Lima Region, Oyón Province, Oyón District.

References

Mountains of Peru
Mountains of Lima Region
Lakes of Peru
Lakes of Lima Region